Dwaraka Nath Das  is an Indian politician. He was elected to the Lok Sabha the lower house of Indian Parliament from Karimganj, Assam in 1991 and 1996. He belongs to the Bharatiya Janata Party.

References

India MPs 1991–1996
India MPs 1996–1997
Lok Sabha members from Assam
People from Karimganj district
Bharatiya Janata Party politicians from Assam